Byron Gilbert Bradfute (December 12, 1937 - October 30, 2020) is a former American football offensive tackle in the National Football League for the Dallas Cowboys. He played college football at the University of Southern Mississippi and Abilene Christian University.

Early years
Bradfute attended A. C. Jones High School, where he was a two-time All-district selection at tackle.

He accepted a scholarship from Abilene Christian University. As a junior, he was thrown out of the team for drinking beer. He finished his senior season at the University of Southern Mississippi.

Professional career
Bradfute was selected by the Los Angeles Chargers in the 1960 AFL Draft, but instead chose to sign with the NFL's Dallas Cowboys as a free agent.

He was a reserve offensive tackle and was a part of the franchise's inaugural season. The next year, he played in 5 games after suffering an injury. On July 29, 1962, he announced his retirement. Byron died on October 30, 2020.

References

1937 births
2020 deaths
People from Beeville, Texas
Players of American football from Texas
American football offensive tackles
Abilene Christian Wildcats football players
Southern Miss Golden Eagles football players
Dallas Cowboys players